Rebel Child is the debut studio album recorded by Canadian singer and songwriter Tenille Arts. It was first released October 27, 2017 through the independent label imprint 19th & Grand. Arts co-wrote every track except for the lead single, "Cold Feet". A deluxe edition of the album was later issued on February 9, 2018 with additional tracks including the second single, "Moment of Weakness" and a cover of "Black Velvet".

Rebel Child entered the Billboard Country Album Sales chart at number 45 in 2019.

Promotion
"Cold Feet" was released on July 21, 2017 as the record's lead single. The song also serves as Arts's debut American single. "Cold Feet" received praise from music critics and was featured in a "Makin' Tracks" article in the Billboard Country Update, a first for an independent release.

A new track, "Moment of Weakness", was released as a single on January 26, 2018. Three days later, the song was featured in an episode of the 22nd season of the American reality television series, The Bachelor. Exposure from the show and resulting media coverage caused the song to enter the top 10 of the country music sales charts in Canada and generated renewed interest in Rebel Child and her self-titled debut extended play (2016). Two versions of the song were included on a deluxe edition reissue of the album in February 2018. Her appearance on the show contributed to Arts being signed to Reviver Records.

Accolades
Arts earned three awards for the album and its tracks at the 2018 Saskatchewan Country Music Association awards, including Album of the Year, Songwriter of the Year (for "Raindrops, Dirt Roads"), and Video of the Year ("Cold Feet").

Track listing

Charts

References

2017 debut albums
Tenille Arts albums